Lenny Fernandes Coelho (born 23 March 1988), simply known as Lenny, is a retired Brazilian footballer who played as a second striker.

Biography
Lenny left Fluminense in January 2008 for R$1.5 million. Palmeiras, associated with Desportivo Brasil (owned by Traffic Group), signed him.

On 9 May 2013, he signed a deal with Campeonato Brasileiro Série C club Madureira.

Honours
Fluminense
Brazilian Cup: 2007

Palmeiras
São Paulo State Championship: 2008

References

External links

1988 births
Living people
Footballers from Rio de Janeiro (city)
Brazilian footballers
Association football forwards
Campeonato Brasileiro Série A players
J1 League players
Lenny Fernandes Coelho
Fluminense FC players
Sociedade Esportiva Palmeiras players
Figueirense FC players
Boavista Sport Club players
Madureira Esporte Clube players
Clube Atlético Sorocaba players
Primeira Liga players
S.C. Braga players
Ventforet Kofu players
Lenny Fernandes Coelho
Lenny Fernandes Coelho
Brazilian expatriate footballers
Brazilian expatriate sportspeople in Portugal
Brazilian expatriate sportspeople in Japan
Expatriate footballers in Portugal
Expatriate footballers in Japan
Expatriate footballers in Thailand